Coues's climbing mouse (Rhipidomys couesi) is a species of rodent in the family Cricetidae. It is found in Colombia, Ecuador, Peru, Trinidad and Tobago, and Venezuela. It is named in honour of the American zoologist Elliott Coues who studied birds and small mammals.

Description
The fur is rather coarse and short. The upper parts vary in colour from yellowish brown to reddish brown, the individual hairs being banded, and having black or dark brown guard hairs mixed among them. The underparts are creamy-white or yellowish, the hairs sometimes having grey bases. The tail is the same length as the head-and-body or a little longer, with dark scales, reddish-brown or dark brown hairs and a long terminal tuft of hair.

Distribution and habitat
Coues's climbing mouse is a native of northern South America. It occurs in an arc from Trinidad and the island of Margarita, through the coastal region of northern Venezuela, and a swathe of west-central Venezuela (the southeasterly side of the Merida Andes and the foothills of the Eastern Cordillera) to Meta Department in central Colombia. This mouse is probably also present in the belt of humid forest connecting some of these areas. Further south than this, this mouse is replaced by the white-footed climbing mouse (Rhipidomys leucodactylus). It is an arboreal, nocturnal species and its typical habitats are primary and secondary rainforest, lowland forest and the lower regions of montane forest.

References

Rhipidomys
Mammals of Colombia
Mammals of Trinidad and Tobago
Mammals of the Caribbean
Mammals of Peru
Mammals of Ecuador
Mammals described in 1893
Taxonomy articles created by Polbot